"The High Ground" is the 12th episode of the third season of the American science fiction television series Star Trek: The Next Generation, the 60th episode of the series. Set in the 24th century, the series follows the adventures of the Starfleet crew of the Federation starship Enterprise-D. In this episode, a crew member of the Federation Starfleet starship USS Enterprise-D is taken hostage by terrorists who hope Federation involvement will help them win concessions for their cause.

Plot
The crew of the Enterprise is sent on a mercy mission to deliver medical supplies to the war-torn non-affiliated planet Rutia IV, in the middle of a decades-long conflict with rebel separatists called the Ansata. The Enterprise crew cannot intervene in the conflict itself, internal to the planet, because to do so would violate the Prime Directive. While Chief Medical Officer Dr. Crusher, Commander Data, and Lieutenant Worf relax in a cafe, a bomb goes off in a public plaza, injuring many bystanders. Dr. Crusher attempts to tend to the wounded bodies against Captain Picard's suggestion to return to the ship, but her efforts are interrupted when she is abducted by a man using an unknown method of teleportation. After being denied the use of the Enterprises superior firepower to seek and destroy the Ansata's base of operations, Alexana Devos, the head of Rutian security, orders severe interrogation of all known Ansata sympathizers, an act that the Enterprise crew find immoral. Without new information from Devos, the Enterprise crew investigate the teleportation technology and find that it is used to shift between dimensions, allowing the Ansata rebels to bypass even force fields. The investigative team, which includes Wesley, lets Picard know that they need to observe more of the teleportations to be able to pinpoint the location of the base.

At the Ansata base, Crusher learns her abductor is Kyril Finn, the leader of Ansata. Crusher refuses to eat or otherwise cooperate with Finn. After several hours, Finn lets Crusher out of her restraints and requests that she help treat their wounded. Crusher discovers that the "Inverters", the Ansata teleportation technology, cause irreversible damage to the user's DNA, and that many of the Ansata are sick due to excessive use of the Inverter. Finn admits that the Inverter is their only advantage against the Rutian government. After more hours pass, Finn believes that the Federation, by providing medical aid, is working with the Rutian government and launches an attack on the Enterprise, despite Crusher's requests to avoid harming her son. The Ansata manage to plant a bomb on the Enterprise warp engine. It is quickly transported into space by La Forge, but the distraction is enough to allow Finn to appear on the bridge and abduct Captain Picard. With Picard as his captive, Finn uses the Inverter to come to Counselor Troi on the Enterprise and demand the Federation become involved in mediating the dispute, returning to the planet before security can arrive. Picard, learning of Crusher's situation, tells her to continue to work on gaining Finn's confidence to hopefully end the dispute peacefully.

Data and Wesley are able to use Finn's appearance to locate the Ansata base, and Commander Riker and Devos assemble their forces. After they transport into the base, the combined forces are quickly able to quell the resistance. Finn, as a last resort, attempts to execute Picard, but Devos kills him. It is her conclusion that if Finn remained alive, his imprisonment would spark more resistance, while being killed in battle will only elevate him to martyr status and reduce the violence in the short-term. When a young Ansata member attempts to exact revenge on Picard, Crusher is able to convince him to drop his weapon, which Riker notes is a sign that there may be more fruitful discussions to resolve the issue in the future.

United Kingdom and Republic of Ireland broadcast
In his study of instances when terrorism has worked, Data notes that Ireland was unified in 2024. As a result, this episode was not originally shown by the BBC in the United Kingdom, which had previously been attacked by the Provisional Irish Republican Army, due to the conflict in Northern Ireland ongoing at the time known as the Troubles, over remaining within the United Kingdom. It was not broadcast in the Republic of Ireland by the Star Trek rights' holder, RTÉ, during the show's run though UK broadcasts were received there. Initial UK airings were edited and shown for the first time on the satellite channel Sky One on November 29, 1992. The episode was broadcast unedited in May 2006 on Sky One and finally shown unedited on BBC Two during the third season's repeats after midnight on September 29, 2007.

Releases
The episode was released with Star Trek: The Next Generation season three DVD box set, released in the United States on July 2, 2002. This had 26 episodes of Season 3 on seven discs, with a Dolby Digital 5.1 audio track. It was released in high-definition Blu-ray in the United States on April 30, 2013.

The episode was released in Japan on LaserDisc on July 5, 1996, in the half season set Log. 5: Third Season Part.1 by CIC Video. This included episodes up to "A Matter of Perspective" on 12-inch double sided optical discs. The video was in NTSC format with both English and Japanese audio tracks.

Reception
In a 2010 review, Zack Handlen gave the episode a grade B−.

Keith R.A. DeCandido gave the episode 7 out of 10.

References

Further reading

External links

 

Star Trek: The Next Generation (season 3) episodes
1990 American television episodes
Television episodes about abduction
Television episodes about terrorism
Television episodes pulled from general rotation
Television controversies in the United Kingdom
RTÉ controversies